Kukar Pind is a large village in Jalandhar, Punjab, India.

References

Villages in Jalandhar district